Dean Smith (28 November 1958 – 17 April 2009) was an English professional footballer who played as a forward in the Football League for Leicester City and Brentford.

Career

Leicester City 
A forward, Smith began his career in the youth system at hometown First Division club Leicester City in April 1975 and progressed to sign his first professional contract in December 1976. Smith had to wait until September 1977 to make his first team debut, which came when he replaced Eddie Kelly during a 5–1 defeat to Everton. Smith's most notable moment in a Foxes shirt came on 23 March 1978, when he scored his only goal for the club in a 3–2 defeat to Manchester United. Smith made 10 appearances during the 1977–78 season, but departed Filbert Street in October 1978 after failing to make an appearance during the early months of the 1978–79 season.

Houston Hurricane (loan) 
During the English off-season in the summer of 1978, Smith moved to the United States to join North American Soccer League club Houston Hurricane on loan. He scored six goals in 17 appearances for the Hurricane in a disappointing 1978 season, which saw the club finish bottom of the American Conference Central Division.

Brentford 
Smith signed for Third Division club Brentford for a £20,000 fee in October 1978. He made something of a breakthrough into the first team, making 26 appearances and scoring eight goals during the 1978–79 season. Smith made a further 25 appearances during the 1979–80 season, but the arrival of Fred Callaghan as manager changed the team's style of play and he drifted out of the first team picture. Smith departed Brentford in February 1981, after being suspended by the club for a breach of discipline. He made 61 appearances and scored 17 goals during his time at Griffin Park.

Non-league football 
After his departure from Brentford, Smith dropped into non-league football and played for Nuneaton Borough, Shepshed Charterhouse, Enderby Town, Hinckley Town, Corby Town, St Andrews and Oadby Town.

Personal life 
It was reported in September 2008 that Smith had suffered a stroke and was battling throat cancer. He died on 17 April 2009 at the age of 50.

Career statistics

References

1958 births
2009 deaths
English footballers
Leicester City F.C. players
Houston Hurricane players
Brentford F.C. players
English Football League players
Nuneaton Borough F.C. players
Shepshed Dynamo F.C. players
Leicester United F.C. players
Footballers from Leicester
Hinckley Town F.C. players
Southern Football League players
Association football forwards
Deaths from throat cancer
English expatriate sportspeople in the United States
English expatriate footballers
Expatriate soccer players in the United States
North American Soccer League (1968–1984) players
National League (English football) players
Corby Town F.C. players
St Andrews F.C. players
Oadby Town F.C. players
Deaths from cancer in England